Steven "Steve" Hoban (born 1964) is a Canadian film producer.  He has been nominated for three Genie Awards and won another.  He has collaborated with Vincenzo Natali, David Hewlett, and Chris Landreth on multiple films.  He is perhaps best known for Splice and the Ginger Snaps trilogy.

Biography 
Steve Hoban was born in Ottawa, Ontario, Canada, in 1964.  Hoban told Screen International that his favorite film is Taken, but not for creative reasons; Hoban said that he admires the film for its repeatable business model and success at the American box office despite its lack of traditional indicators of success.

Career 
Hoban and director Vincenzo Natali are friends and have collaborated on several films, including Nothing, Splice, and Haunter.  Hoban has also collaborated with Chris Landreth on animated shorts, including The Spine and Ryan, which won an Academy Award.

In 2001, Hoban co-founded 49th Parallel, a Montreal-based film production company.  Among the early projects that they produced was Natali's 2003 film Nothing and Landreth's 2004 short Ryan.  Hoban's new company, Copperheart Entertainment, is based in Toronto.

In 2013, he collaborated with Natali again to produce and direct the television series Darknet.  This was his directorial debut.

A television adaptation of William Gibson's The Peripheral was put into development in April 2018, with Hoban an executive producer.

Awards

Filmography

Films

Television

References

External links 
 

Living people
1964 births
Film producers from Ontario
People from Ottawa